Highs in the Mid-Sixties, Volume 8 (subtitled The South) is a compilation album in the Highs in the Mid-Sixties series, featuring recordings that were released in the South excluding Texas (which is covered in 5 separate volumes).  Highs in the Mid-Sixties, Volume 22 is a later volume in the series that features bands from these Southern states.

Release data
This album was released in 1984 as an LP by AIP Records (as #AIP-10014).

Notes on the tracks
In their remarkable 30th year reunion album GONN with the Wind, the Iowa garage rock band GONN included a cover of "Found Love".

Track listing

Side 1

 Ravin' Blue: "Love" (A. Christopher, Jr./R. Bernard/L. Nix)
 Gunga Dins: "Rebecca Rodifer" (M. King/S. Staples)
 The Midknights: "Pain" (Jerry Wallace)
 Fly by Nites: "Found Love" (Fly-by-Nites)
 The Original Dukes: "Ain't About to Lose My Cool" (Hickman/Sonday/Best)
 Skeptics: "Turn It On" (Wayne Carson)
 The Moxies: "I'm Gonna Stay" (G. Coryell/C. Cummings)
 The Rogues: "I Don't Need You" (McDiarmid)

Side 2
 The Hazards: "Hey Joe" (Billy Roberts) — rel. 1966
 The Vikings: "Come on and Love Me" (C. Putman/C. Nettles)
 The Surrealistic Pillar: "I Like Girls" (Ed Futch/Eddie Smith)
 The Rugbys: "Walking the Streets Tonight" (Doug Sahm)
 The Sants: "Leaving You Baby" (Cirrincione/Wimberley)
 Ravin' Blue: "It's Not Real" (R. Bernard)
 The Guilloteens: "Crying All Over My Time" (Dickinson/Hutcherson)
 Gunga Dins: "No One Cares" (M. King./S. Staples)

Pebbles (series) albums
1984 compilation albums